Charles Celindo Maussa Diaz (born September 24, 1971), best known as Carlos Maussa, is a Colombian former professional boxer who competed from 2000 to 2007, and held the WBA super light welterweight title in 2005.

Professional career
Turning pro in 2000, at the age of 29, Maussa won two titles and fought in several significant fights until his retirement at age 38.

Maussa was raised in the Santa Fe neighborhood of Montería, a city located in the banks of the Sinú River, where he began his impressive amateur career, which ultimately brought him just nine defeats in 130 bouts. Maussa was named National Champion four times and was also crowned the Central American champion. He gained the nickname “The Apostle” by his frequent preaching of the Christian gospel.

In his professional career, while never a superstar fighter, he was a highly touted "gatekeeper" who helped define the careers of several light welterweight prospects.

Notable fights
Maussa began his career with twelve victories in his native Colombia before coming to the United States.  He then won four bouts in the U.S. before facing highly touted New York prospect Jeffrey Resto, described as "perhaps the most-talked-about young pro in New York".  In this battle of two undefeated fighters (17-0 Resto vs. 16-0 Maussa), Resto was unable to deal with Maussa's unorthodox fighting style and abruptly quit in the 6th round, earning Maussa an unexpected victory. Both fighters' careers ended half a decade later with a loss to the same fighter, Victor Ortiz.

Maussa's win over Resto earned him a shot at fellow 17-0 boxer and WBC International light welterweight titleholder Miguel Angel Cotto.  Maussa's fight against Cotto was less successful, resulting in Cotto winning by an 8th round TKO.  Following this, Maussa fought in three lower-profile fights, winning two.  Then, on 25 June 2005, he entered the popular consciousness of boxing fans with an upset win by KO against WBA light-welterweight titlist Vivian Harris. This exciting victory made Maussa a new champion in one of boxing’s competitive divisions.

The bout was notable for a number of reasons: Harris was an overwhelming favorite and is regarded as one of the best boxers at the weight and Maussa’s awkwardly clever style and frequent clowning gestures and facial expressions lent him an air of amateurishness. At the beginning of the seventh round Maussa delivered a stunning left hook, KO-ing Harris. Maussa then lunged downward and punched him in the head while he was already supine on the canvas. The ropes absorbed the impact of the blow. Still, this act has led to much controversy, as the hit could have disqualified Maussa. After the match, however, the bout referees ruled that the late hit was “insignificant”, allowing Maussa to keep his title. When interviewed about this punch, Maussa claimed he didn't connect with Harris on purpose, and that his sole intention was to impress the fallen Harris in case he had any desire to fight on.

The victory cemented Maussa's reputation as somewhat of a gatekeeper for up-and-coming light welterweight prospects, but ended up being his last victory.  On 26 November 2005 Maussa lost his WBA title against IBF title-holder, Ricky Hatton, in a unification bout.  After a unanimous decision loss to Manuel Guarnica, Maussa fought well-regarded future titleholder Victor Ortiz, and was knocked out in the first round.  Following this, Maussa retired with a professional record of 20 wins and 5 losses in a total of 113 professional rounds of boxing.

Professional boxing record

References

External links

The least expected Apostle, 2005 article at ESPN

1971 births
Living people
World light-welterweight boxing champions
Colombian male boxers
World Boxing Association champions
People from Montería
Light-welterweight boxers
21st-century Colombian people